In mathematics, a semi-Hilbert space is a generalization of a Hilbert space in functional analysis, in which, roughly speaking, the inner product is required only to be positive semi-definite rather than positive definite, so that it gives rise to a seminorm rather than a vector space norm. 

The quotient of this space by the kernel of this seminorm is also required to be a Hilbert space in the usual sense.

References 

 Optimal Interpolation in Semi-Hilbert Spaces 

Topological vector spaces